Peter John Farrelly (born December 17, 1956) is an American film director, screenwriter, producer and novelist. Along with his brother Bobby, the Farrelly brothers are mostly famous for directing and producing quirky comedy and romantic comedy films such as Dumb and Dumber; Shallow Hal; Me, Myself and Irene; There's Something About Mary; and the 2007 remake of The Heartbreak Kid. On his own in 2018 Farrelly co-wrote and directed the comedy-drama Green Book, which won the Audience Award at the Toronto International Film Festival in 2018. For his work on the film, he also won the Golden Globe Award for Best Screenplay and the Academy Awards for Best Picture and Best Original Screenplay.

Early life and education
Farrelly was born in Phoenixville, Pennsylvania, to Mariann (Neary), a nurse practitioner, and Robert Leo Farrelly, a doctor. His grandparents were Irish immigrants, and he also has Polish ancestry. He was raised in Cumberland, Rhode Island. He graduated from Kent School in 1975 and from Providence College where he studied accounting. In 1986 he earned a master's in fine arts from Columbia University.

Career

Writer
Farrelly decided to pursue writing full-time, which prompted him to quit his sales job and relocate to Cape Cod, Massachusetts, where he got a job as a waiter. On one of the tables he was waiting, Farrelly struck up a conversation with a writing professor from UMass Amherst, who encouraged Farrelly to apply to graduate school. Farrelly said he did not think his chances were good, considering he did poorly in college but the professor said not everything is judged by grades. With what would later be Outside Providence, Farrelly submitted the work and was pleasantly surprised that he was accepted. He studied writing for a time at UMass Amherst, but was ultimately dissatisfied with the program, and transferred to Columbia University in New York City, which Farrelly said he found very satisfying. He later became interested in screenwriting, which led him to directing. He made this career decision after many of his screenplays sold but were not produced.

He is a published novelist, with works including Outside Providence (1988) and The Comedy Writer (1998).

Producer and director
Together with his brother, Bobby Farrelly, he has written, directed, and produced several comedy films including There's Something About Mary, Dumb and Dumber, Kingpin, Shallow Hal, Me, Myself & Irene, Stuck on You, and Fever Pitch. They also conceived the 1992 Seinfeld episode "The Virgin" (Season 4.Episode:10).

In 2006, Farrelly directed the Man Laws series of television commercials for the Miller Lite beer brand, which featured actor Burt Reynolds, American football player Jerome Bettis, climber Aron Ralston, and professional wrestler Triple H.

Peter worked on a film entitled, Movie 43, which was released in 2013 and produced by the siblings' long-time producer Charles B. Wessler. He produced the anthology film and directed two of its segments.

In 2011 the Farrellys produced and directed Hall Pass.

The brothers produced and directed The Three Stooges in 2012.

In 2012, Peter and his brother announced that the filming of Dumb and Dumber To would begin in 2013. The film was released on November 14, 2014.

In 2016, Audience announced that Loudermilk, a new half-hour scripted comedy co-created by Farrelly and Bobby Mort, would receive a straight-to-series order. In 2018, the show was renewed for season 2, and in 2021 a third season was aired on Amazon Prime Video.

In 2018, Farrelly directed Green Book, which won the Toronto International Film Festival's People Choice Award.  At the 91st Academy Awards, he won the Oscars for Best Original Screenplay and Best Picture.

In 2020, Farrelly directed alongside his brother, and co-wrote the Quibi comedy series The Now, starring Bill Murray, Dave Franco, O'Shea Jackson Jr., Daryl Hannah, and Jimmy Tatro.

Board member
Farrelly is a board member of Direct Sports Network (formerly DeskSite).

Personal life 
Farrelly is married to Melinda Kocsis and has a son, Bob, and a daughter, Apple. He has two sisters, Beth and Cindy, and a third sister, Kathy, who died in November 2017. Peter lives in California, while brother Bobby lives in Massachusetts.

In 1998, Farrelly's colleagues told Newsweek magazine that he and his brother Bobby "liked to use ruses to get people to look at Farrelly’s penis" as a joke. Those who had been tricked into seeing Farrelly's genitals include film executive Tom Rothman and actress Cameron Diaz. In 2019 after the story resurfaced, Farrelly stated: "I did this decades ago, and I thought I was being funny, and the truth is I’m embarrassed, and it makes me cringe now. I’m deeply sorry."

Philanthropy and honors 

Farrelly is a long-time supporter of disability rights. In 2020, he and his brother Bobby received the Morton E. Ruderman Award for Inclusion of People with Disabilities. Past winners include Michael Phelps and Marlee Matlin. He won the 2015 Lifetime Achievement Award bestowed by Media Access Awards.

Filmography

Films

Television

Awards and nominations

Farrelly won or was nominated for awards for his work in film and television, including winning two Academy Awards and winning two Golden Globe Awards out of five nominations for Green Book in 2019.  He also won or was nominated for several film festival awards.

References

External links

1956 births
Living people
People from Phoenixville, Pennsylvania
Film producers from Pennsylvania
American male screenwriters
American film producers
American people of Irish descent
American television directors
American television producers
Best Screenplay Golden Globe winners
Columbia University School of the Arts alumni
Science fiction film directors
Action film directors
Comedy film directors
Horror film directors
Fantasy film directors
Kent School alumni
People from Cumberland, Rhode Island
Providence College alumni
Film directors from Pennsylvania
Film directors from Rhode Island
Producers who won the Best Picture Academy Award
Screenwriters from Pennsylvania
Screenwriters from Rhode Island
Best Original Screenplay Academy Award winners
Golden Globe Award-winning producers